Ryan Ochoa (born May 17, 1996) is an American actor. He is known for playing the role of Lanny on the Disney XD series Pair of Kings, and for his recurring role of Chuck Chambers on the Nickelodeon series iCarly.

Early life 
Ryan Ochoa was born in San Diego, California. His ancestry includes Mexican, Filipino, Italian, Irish, and Russian-Jewish. He has four siblings, including younger brother Raymond Ochoa.

Career 

Ochoa had his first professional acting job at the age of eight, when he was cast in a national commercial for Dairy Queen.

Ryan's film debut was in the 2007 film, Nostalgia as Ryan Zorn, the son of the main character. He appeared in the 2009 film The Perfect Game as Norberto, one of the 9 baseball players. He also played Tiny Tim in 2009's A Christmas Carol. Ochoa played the voice of the character of Rick in the animated film Astro Boy.

Ochoa has appeared in the television show, iCarly, in the episodes "iHurt Lewbert", "iReunite with Missy", "iTwins", "iFind Lewbert's Lost Love", "iBloop", and "iBeat the Heat". He reprised his role in the 2021 revival series.

In 2011 he appeared in Disney's Friends for Change. He co-starred as Lanny in the Disney XD series Pair of Kings, and as Max Doyle in the straight-to-DVD film Mostly Ghostly: Have You Met My Ghoulfriend?.

He is currently performing with his three brothers in the musical group Ochoa Boyz.

Filmography

Film

Television

Web series 
 P.O.K. Save the Island (2020), as Lanny; also director, editor

References

External links 

1996 births
Living people
American male actors of Mexican descent
American people of Russian-Jewish descent
American male child actors
American male television actors
American male film actors
Male actors from San Diego